Wodnica may refer to the following places in Poland:
Wodnica, Lower Silesian Voivodeship (south-west Poland)
Wodnica, Pomeranian Voivodeship (north Poland)